Dan Goich was a former professional American football player who played defensive lineman for five seasons for the Detroit Lions, New Orleans Saints, and New York Giants.

References

1944 births
American football defensive linemen
Detroit Lions players
New Orleans Saints players
New York Giants players
California Golden Bears football players
Living people
Players of American football from Chicago
American people of Slavic descent